Tallashua Creek is a stream in the U.S. state of Mississippi.

Tallashua is a name derived from the Choctaw language meaning "palmettos are there". Variant names are "Talasha Creek", "Tallasher Creek", and "Tallashuah Creek".

References

Rivers of Mississippi
Rivers of Neshoba County, Mississippi
Rivers of Newton County, Mississippi
Mississippi placenames of Native American origin